LaRue is the first studio album by the American Christian duo LaRue, composed of siblings Phillip and Natalie LaRue. The album was leased on February 2, 2000 on CD by Reunion Records.  Heather Phares writes in her AllMusic review that "LaRue is one of the most appealing and engaging CCM albums in recent memory."

Track listing

References

2000 albums
LaRue (band) albums